Pacific Blackout is a 1941 American mystery thriller film directed by Ralph Murphy and starring Robert Preston, Eva Gabor and Martha O'Driscoll. It was produced and distributed by Paramount Pictures.

Plot
Inventor and engineer Robert Draper is unjustly found guilty for the murder of his partner.  Just as he's sent to prison, the prison truck crashes in the midst of a civil defense blackout, propelling him into a search for the real killers who framed him.  Czech-American screenwriter Franz Schulz was billed as Francis Spencer for the film.

Cast 
 Robert Preston as Robert Draper
 Martha O'Driscoll as Mary Jones
 Philip Merivale as John Runnell
 Eva Gabor as Marie Duval
 Louis Jean Heydt as Harold Kermin
 Thurston Hall as Williams, Civil Defense Official
 Mary Treen as Irene 
 J. Edward Bromberg as Pickpocket
 Spencer Charters as Cornelius 
 Cy Kendall as Hotel Clerk
 Russell Hicks as Commanding Officer
 Paul Stanton as Judge
 Clem Bevans as Night-watchman
 Robert Emmett Keane as Defense Attorney
 Edwin Maxwell as District attorney
 Rod Cameron as Pilot
 unbilled players include Monte Blue, Wade Boteler, Ralph Dunn, Bess Flowers, Jack Norton, Betty Farrington and Lee Shumway

References

Bibliography
 Parish, James & Robert & Pitts, Michael R. The Great Spy Pictures. Scarecrow Press, 1974.

External links 
 
 Turner Classic Movies page

1941 films
Paramount Pictures films
Films directed by Ralph Murphy
1940s thriller films
Films with screenplays by Franz Schulz
American thriller films
American black-and-white films
1940s English-language films
1940s American films